Commune of Clemency was a former commune in Luxembourg. Its main city was Clemency with a population of 1832. The law creating the commune of Käerjeng was passed on 24 May 2011.

On 1 January 2012 the existing communes of Clemency and Bascharage with its main city the same named Bascharage were merged into one commune named Käerjeng. Bascharage was assigned as capital of the merged commune.

Former commune
The former commune consisted of the villages:

 Clemency
 Fingig
 Schockmillen (lieu-dit)
 Nuechtbann (lieu-dit)
 Neudrisch (lieu-dit)

References

Former communes of Luxembourg